Henry Frederick William Behnsen (March 16, 1852 – March 6, 1938) was a German-born cigar manufacturer and political figure in British Columbia. He represented Victoria City from 1907 to 1916 in the Legislative Assembly of British Columbia as a Conservative.

He was born in Hanover and was educated there. Behnsen served as a paymaster in the German Army. In 1878, he married Elizabeth G. Reade.

He died in Seattle on March 6, 1938.

References

External links 
 

1852 births
1938 deaths
British Columbia Conservative Party MLAs